Samuel Lerner (January 28, 1903 – December 13, 1989) was a Romanian-born songwriter for American and British musical theatre and film.

Career
Lerner emigrated with his parents into the United States at age seven, and the family settled in Detroit, Michigan. After graduating from Wayne State University, Lerner moved to New York City, where he began writing songs for vaudeville performers such as Sophie Tucker. Lerner also contributed lyrics to the Ziegfeld Follies.

With the coming of sound film, Lerner began writing songs for motion pictures, including several for use in the Paramount Pictures cartoons produced by Fleischer Studios. Two of these included signature songs for Max Fleischer's most successful cartoon stars, Betty Boop ("Don't Take My Boo-oop-a-doop Away", co-written with Sammy Timberg) and Popeye the Sailor ("I'm Popeye the Sailor Man"). Mr. Lerner composed I'm Popeye the Sailor Man in less than two hours for the cartoonist Dave Fleischer. The lyrics included the line, I'm strong to the  'cause I eats me spinach. Lerner's Popeye theme is particularly well known, and has followed the character into television, feature films, and video games.

Mr. Lerner's work in the 1930s and 1940s included "Is It True What They Say About Dixie?" and English lyrics to "Falling in Love Again (Can't Help It)", Marlene Dietrich's song in the film The Blue Angel.

After writing songs for American features, Lerner moved to London, England in 1936 to write for British musical theatre and film. He returned to America in 1938, and became a member of the executive council at the Dramatists Guild.

Death
Lerner died of cancer in 1989 at the age of 86, in a Los Angeles nursing home.

References
(December 16, 1989). " Sammy Lerner, 86; Hollywood Songwriter" (AP obit.). The New York Times. Digital version retrieved August 26, 2007.

External links

1903 births
1989 deaths
People from Săveni
Jewish composers
Romanian composers
Romanian Jews
Wayne State University alumni
Deaths from cancer in California
20th-century composers
Burials at Hillside Memorial Park Cemetery
Romanian emigrants to the United States